Halgerda guahan is a species of sea slug, a dorid nudibranch, a shell-less marine gastropod mollusk in the family Discodorididae.

Distribution
This species was described from Guam, Mariana Islands. It has also been reported from Saipan in the northern Mariana Islands.

References

Discodorididae
Gastropods described in 1993